The 1954 Sydney to Hobart Yacht Race was won on handicap by Solveig, making her the overall winner in 1954. She had obtained line honours in 1953.

The Solveig

The 36-foot double ender was built in 1950 in Sydney by the Norwegian family business Lars Halvorsen Sons, built of Oregan (Douglas Fir) on Australian Hardwood frames. 1954 was the fifth and last Sydney to Hobart Yacht Race that Solveig entered, as she was shipped to the West Coast of the United States in 1955 to compete in the then longest ocean race in the world, the Transpac from San Pedro, California to Diamond Head, Hawaii. After the race Solveig was sold to a local businessman Don Doyle and remained in Hawaii from 1955 until 2017. Her last American owner, Lawrence "Chip" Wheeler, had her for ten years, during which time he performed a much-needed refit and made modifications to the boat for blue water cruising. In January 2107, she was shipped by container ship from Honolulu to Sydney by the then Commodore of the Halvorsen Club, restored to original lines and is now racing and sailing on Sydney Harbour in a fleet of classic yachts.

References

Sydney to Hobart Yacht Race
S
1954 in Australian sport
December 1954 sports events in Australia